Ekaterina Vladimirovna Malkova ((born 12 December 1992; née Bolotova) is a Russian badminton player. She was the women's doubles silver medalist at the 2015 Baku European Games with partner Evgeniya Kosetskaya, and later won a bronze medal in 2019 Minsk with Alina Davletova.

Personal life 
She is married to Saratov badminton player Vladimir Malkov.

Achievements

European Games 
Women's doubles

BWF Grand Prix (2 runners-up) 
The BWF Grand Prix had two levels, the Grand Prix and Grand Prix Gold. It was a series of badminton tournaments sanctioned by the Badminton World Federation (BWF) and played between 2007 and 2017.

Women's doubles

  BWF Grand Prix Gold tournament
  BWF Grand Prix tournament

BWF International Challenge/Series (14 titles, 4 runners-up) 
Women's doubles

Mixed doubles

  BWF International Challenge tournament
  BWF International Series tournament
  BWF Future Series tournament

References

External links 
 
  at www.baku2015.com

1992 births
Living people
People from Orekhovo-Zuyevo
Badminton players from Moscow
Russian female badminton players
Badminton players at the 2015 European Games
Badminton players at the 2019 European Games
European Games silver medalists for Russia
European Games bronze medalists for Russia
European Games medalists in badminton
21st-century Russian women